HNoMS Nidaros was the first steam corvette of the Royal Norwegian Navy. She was built together with three other corvettes; although different in armament and size, these were quite similar: Nordstjernen, Ellida and Ørnen. These corvettes were built slim, for greater performance under sail. 

The steam engine of Nidaros performed a maximum of 40 rpm, and the propeller had 6 blades. "Even with our conceptions today, we must admit that this corvette was of a very fine and slender construction (...) Both regarding its steam engine and the six 60-pounder bomb-cannons, Nidaros represented the new age [in the Norwegian Navy]."

The Nidaros was used as lodging- and training ship for the Navy's torpedo-branch, at least until 1876. She was finally scrapped in 1903.

References 

Corvettes of the Royal Norwegian Navy
1841 ships
Ships built in Horten